Max Montoya Jr. (born May 12, 1956) is a former professional American football guard who played 16 seasons in the National Football League.

Early life
Montoya who is of Mexican–American descent, attended La Puente High School in La Puente, California. He was unable to play football or basketball his senior season due to a heart murmur.

College career
Montoya was cleared to play football again and began his college football career playing for Mt. San Antonio College (Mt. SAC), a community college in Walnut, California. He did not start as a freshman, but after an outstanding sophomore season, he earned a football scholarship to UCLA, where he would play for head coach Terry Donahue. After redshirting for a year, Montoya was a starter in 1977 as the Bruins posted a 7-4 record. In 1978, he was again a starter, earning All Pac-10 honors. The Bruins in 1978 went 8-3-1, ended the season in both the AP and UPI Top 20 rankings and played to a 10-10 tie against Arkansas in the 1978 Fiesta Bowl.

Professional career
Montoya was drafted in the 7th round (168th overall) of the 1979 NFL Draft. Montoya was a four-time Pro Bowl guard who played in two Super Bowls with the Cincinnati Bengals. He played 11 seasons for the Bengals, from 1979 to 1989, becoming a starter in his second season. He then played five seasons for the Los Angeles Raiders, starting in all but his final season.

Personal life
After retiring from the NFL, Montoya invested in a restaurant franchise of Cincinnati-based Penn Station East Coast Subs and eventually owned four in northern Kentucky. He is also a founder and silent partner of Montoya's Restaurant in Fort Mitchell, Kentucky. He also spent five years helping coach the Beechwood High School football team (including son Matthew, now a multimedia freelancer) in Fort Mitchell, Kentucky. His daughter, Alison Montoya (a twin of Matthew), is a general assignment reporter and anchor for Cincinnati FOX affiliate WXIX after previously working for WLWT.

Montoya is now semi-retired and lives with his wife, Patty, on a farm in Hebron, Kentucky, where he raises horses.

References

External links
 https://www.pro-football-reference.com/players/M/MontMa00.htm

American football offensive guards
Players of American football from California
1956 births
Living people
American sportspeople of Mexican descent
UCLA Bruins football players
Cincinnati Bengals players
Los Angeles Raiders players
American Conference Pro Bowl players
People from La Puente, California
Sportspeople from Montebello, California